Gillian Angela Joseph (born 20 July 1969) is a British newscaster currently working for Sky News. Joseph is the anchor of weekend editions of Sky News at Ten.

Early life
She was born in 1969 in Coventry, England. Her parents originated from Dominica in the Caribbean. Her parents returned to Dominica, where her mother worked as a teacher, but the family later returned to England. She has two daughters and a son.

Joseph was an MA student at City University in London, studying Broadcast Journalism.

Journalism career
Joseph initially worked for the BBC in Manchester, as well as working as a radio reporter for BBC Radio Merseyside. She worked for Newsbeat on BBC Radio 1 in 1994.

In 1998, she moved to London and presented Newsroom South East, until it was cancelled in 2001. She then presented its replacement, BBC London News, until 2005, when she moved to Sky News.

During her time at Sky, Joseph has presented various different slots, including Sky News at Ten and Sky News in the evening alongside Jeremy Thompson.

From 2007 until October 2016, Joseph presented Sunrise alongside Mark Longhurst, and then Stephen Dixon.

From October 2016 until December 2017, Joseph hosted from 5 pm to 8 pm on Saturdays and Sundays. In December 2017 she began maternity cover for Isabel Webster. From October 2019 until summer 2021, Joseph co-anchored Sky News Breakfast at weekends on Sky News. She moved to present Sky News at Ten at weekends in summer 2021.

Other programmes
Joseph co-hosted the 2004 series called Evidence: Through My Experience with Pastor Dwight K. Nelson.

She is also a former reporter for the BBC's Holiday programme.

She also appeared on Celebrity Mastermind on the BBC in 2014, answering questions on her specialist subject "parables of the New Testament".

References

External links
 

1969 births
Living people
British television newsreaders and news presenters
Sky News newsreaders and journalists
Alumni of City, University of London
Black British television personalities
People from Coventry
English people of Dominica descent